Fatty's New Role is a 1915 American short comedy film directed by and starring Fatty Arbuckle.

Plot summary

Cast
 Roscoe 'Fatty' Arbuckle as Hobo
 Mack Swain as Ambrose Schnitz
 Joe Bordeaux
 Glen Cavender
 Bobby Dunn
 Billy Gilbert
 Frank Hayes
 Edgar Kennedy as Man who gives handout
 Hank Mann
 Frank Opperman
 Fritz Schade as Bar patron
 Al St. John as Cop
 Slim Summerville as Bartender
 Luke the Dog

See also
 List of American films of 1915
 Fatty Arbuckle filmography

References

External links
 
 
 

1915 films
1915 comedy films
1915 short films
American silent short films
American black-and-white films
Silent American comedy films
Films directed by Roscoe Arbuckle
Films produced by Mack Sennett
Keystone Studios films
American comedy short films
1910s American films